Panavia was an airline based in Panama City, Panama. Established in 1994, it operated chartered cargo flights out of Tocumen International Airport, Panama City. In 2006, Panavia was shut down.

Destinations 

In 2005, Panavia operated scheduled flights to Bogotá, Mexico City and San José.

Fleet 
At closure, the Panavia fleet consisted of the following aircraft:
1 Boeing 727-100F
1 Boeing 727-200F

External links
Photograph of a Panavia aircraft

References

Defunct airlines of Panama
Defunct cargo airlines
Airlines established in 1994
Airlines disestablished in 2006
1994 establishments in Panama
2006 disestablishments in Panama
Cargo airlines of Panama
Companies based in Panama City